Afrocypholaelaps is a genus of mites in the family Ameroseiidae. This genus currently has a single species, Afrocypholaelaps africanus.

References

Acari

Ameroseiidae